Chad Bertrand (born 19 December 1986) is a Dominican footballer who plays as a midfielder for Guadeloupe Division of Honor club Solidarité-Scolaire and the Dominica national team.

Club career 
Chad Bertrand played with London City of the Canadian Soccer League in 2009. In 2010, he went across the ocean to India to play with SC Goa in the I-League 2nd Division. The following season, he returned home to play with Bath Estate in the Dominica Premiere League. In 2014, he signed with rivals Dublanc FC, where he won the title league in the 2015-2016 season. In 2017, he played abroad in the Guadeloupe Division of Honor with Solidarité-Scolaire.

International career 
Chad Bertrand made his international debut in September 2011 against Bermuda, scoring his first goal against the British Virgin Islands in October 2011.

Career statistics 
Scores and results list Dominica's goal tally first, score column indicates score after each Bertrand goal.

References 

Living people
1986 births
Dominica footballers
Dominica international footballers
Association football midfielders
Canadian Soccer League (1998–present) players
London City players
I-League 2nd Division players
Sporting Clube de Goa players
Bath Estate FC players
Expatriate footballers in India
Dominica expatriate sportspeople in India
Expatriate soccer players in Canada
Dominica expatriate sportspeople in Canada
Expatriate footballers in Guadeloupe
Dominica expatriate sportspeople in Guadeloupe
Dominica expatriate footballers